Zoltán Imre Ödön Halmay de Erdőtelek (18 June 1881, Magasfalu – 20 May 1956, Budapest) was a Hungarian Olympic swimmer. He competed in four Olympics (1900 – 1908), winning the following medals:

 1900: silver (200 m, 4000 m freestyle), bronze (1000 m freestyle)
 1904: gold (50yd, 100yd freestyle)
 1906: gold (4×250 m freestyle relay), silver (100 m freestyle) (these games are now not officially recognized by the IOC)
 1908: silver (100 m freestyle; 4 × 200 m freestyle relay)

Zoltán Halmay, who was a two-time Olympic champion, was the most successful sportsman in freestyle swimming. In 1904 he won the 50 and 100 yards at the St. Louis Games and in 1906 he was a member of the 4×250 m relay team that won the gold medal at the Intercalated Games. He won a further 4 silver medals and a bronze medal at other Olympics. He was Hungarian champion 14 times and won the English, the German and the Austrian Championships as well. He was a world record holder at 100 metres and also at 50 and 220 yards. His versatility is shown by the fact that he was also a remarkable athlete, rower and football player, and he also won a national-level championship in roller-skating over 5000 metres. After his retirement, he worked as a trainer, and he was the federal chief trainer of the Hungarian Swimming Association. At the ceremony organised at the main square of the village, a monument unifying the memorial plaque and the statue of Halmay was set up in collaboration with the Slovak Olympic Committee and the local government of Vysoká pri Morave (Magasfalu).

See also
 List of members of the International Swimming Hall of Fame
 World record progression 100 metres freestyle
 World record progression 200 metres freestyle

References

External links
 

Olympic swimmers of Hungary
1881 births
1956 deaths
People from Malacky District
Sportspeople from the Bratislava Region
Swimmers at the 1900 Summer Olympics
Swimmers at the 1904 Summer Olympics
Swimmers at the 1906 Intercalated Games
Swimmers at the 1908 Summer Olympics
Olympic gold medalists for Hungary
Olympic silver medalists for Hungary
Olympic bronze medalists for Hungary
World record setters in swimming
Olympic bronze medalists in swimming
Hungarian male freestyle swimmers
Male long-distance swimmers
Medalists at the 1908 Summer Olympics
Medalists at the 1904 Summer Olympics
Medalists at the 1900 Summer Olympics
Medalists at the 1906 Intercalated Games
Olympic gold medalists in swimming
Olympic silver medalists in swimming
20th-century Hungarian people